Yoon Il-sang (born February 21, 1974) is a South Korean composer, producer, and songwriter. He graduated from Kyung Hee University Post Modern Music Department, and he is also the co-founder of Nega Network Ltd.

In January 2012, Yoon released a series of digital singles to celebrate his 21st year in the music industry, collectively titled, Yoon Il Sang 21st Anniversary. "Reminiscence" was originally sung in 1997 by Turbo and sold 1,200,000 copies, whereas "Remember" was first released by DJ Doc in 1996 and sold 1,300,000 copies.

Discography

Producer
 "Breaking Destiny" - The Great Seer OST sung by Park Gyuri of Kara

Biography
Yoon first started composing music in 1980, and started working on popular music in 1985. In 1993, the Park Jun-hee songs "Oh, Boy" and "KukKuk" was released. Also in 1993, the Mr2 song "난 단지 나일뿐" was released.

1993 : He's the first hitsong '난 단지 나일뿐' of Mr2 released 

1994 : Produced his first album ‘망가져가’of EQ released 

1995 : Buck's first album produced

1997 : The first Project album ‘SSaiki’ released

1998 : Yoo Seung Jun's 2nd album produced

1999 : Park ji yoon's 3rd album produced

2000 : He was selected as a Most hits song composer since the last 10 years.

2001 : Lee yoon jung's 2nd album produced
Kim bum so's ‘Day (Hello. Goodbye. Hello) ’51 of The Billboard Hot 100 Singles Sales 
chart entry 

2002 : Solo album ‘IS-Soulist’ released, Lee jung hyun 4th album‘I Love Nature’produced 

2003 : Kim bum so's ‘BOGOSIPDA’released (Drama Stairway to Heaven OST), Daum Game ‘Rakiah’ Music Director

2004 : ‘Drama Bulsae OST’ released. Lee seung chul ‘Yin Yeon’ released, Lee jung hyun 5th album produced.

2006 : SBS Drama ‘Tree of Heaven’ Music Director. Shin seung hoon ‘e ddek hajyo’                     
MBC Drama ‘Rude girls’ Music Director. Lee mun se ‘Alsuupnun Insaeng’
PDIS The first single ‘Hold The Line’ released. Mobil
Lee jung hyun 6th album produced
Japanese group Deen's new album ‘Bogosipda’ released. 

2007 BrownEyedGirls single album‘OASIS’released.

2008 Drama ‘Nae saenge Masimak Scandal’ Music Director

2009 PDIS (Jo PD + Yoon il sang) album released, Ivy-Sensatio, Mina-DODO, Hanyoung - Diet, BrownEyedGirls - Mot ga, Jung dok, Cool-BogoBogo, Lee jung hyun – nun naekke, Park hyun bin – Daechan insaeng, Lee Eun mi – He e ji nun jung ip ni da, Byul – Drama lul bo myun, Maydany – molla ing, cheumcherum, ID 

2010  2010 Musical ‘Seo Pyeon je’ every song composition and arrangement, Yoari's ‘Jeogiyo’produced -  Korea's first iPhone band formation and performance

2011 Lee ji young's ‘O nul do’ released, Kim bum so's ‘Last love’ released, 2011 The Musical awards composition department nominated(seopyeonje), Browneyedgirls's ‘La bohem’released , MBC Drama ‘Jigonun motsala OST – Dolawajoyo’ released., 20th anniversary of Kim gun mo music ‘The piano’ announced.

Career
1998 Founded NTN Entertainment

2002 Renamed IS Media

2003 NEGANETWORK Co., Ltd. Co-founder (Yoon il sang, LANCE)

Awards
1996 SBS Best composer Award

1997 SBS Best composer Award

2000 Most hits song composer named since the last 10 years

2001 Kim bum so's ‘Day (Hello. Goodbye. Hello) ’51 of The Billboard Hot 100 Singles Sales 
chart entry 

2006 PDIS <Hold The Line> Mobile Best song award

2007 The 15th Korea Popular Entertainer awards‘New Generation composer’award

2009 Lee Eun Mi-‘I have a lover’ for two years Noraebang ranked No.1 song. ( Internet MR and feelTONG using survey result)

2010 Korea musical awards composer department nominated (sepyenje)

2011 Noraebang No.1 favorite song ‘I have a lover’

2011 The musical awards. composer department nominated (sepyenje)

Broadcasting activity
2011 MBC TV program ‘Akdong club’ Judges

2007 MBC ‘Muhan dojeon – Gangbyeonbukro song festival’ composition and judges

2011 MBC ‘I'm singer’ consultant.

2011 MBC ‘Birth of the great season2’Mento

2022 MBC Riverside Song Festival New Challenge Judges

Discography
 Yoo Jae Suk: Samba
 Kim Gun Mo: One Flew Bird Over the Cuckoo's Nest, Budamsori, Crying
 Kim Bum-soo: Bogosipda, Day, You Leave Me, Natana, ast love
 DJ DOC: Beauty and Beast(OK?OK!), Winter Story, Remember
 Park Ji-yoon: "I Don't Know Anything" (1999), "Steal Away", "Go Away"
 Shin Seung-hun: What Should I Do
 Young Turks Club: JUNG, TA-IN
 YB: I Will Forget
 Lee Moon Se: Unknown life
 Lee Seung-cheol: Even today I, Fate
 Lee Eun Mi: I Have A Lover, Being Break Up, Nocturne, Sinner
 Lee Jung-hyun: Jul-lae, Crazy, Dal-a Dla-a, Summer Dance
 Lee Yoon Jung: Seduce
 Sechs Kies: Presentiment, Reckless love, Feelings
 Cho PD: La La Land (feat. JeA and Narsha)
 Cool: "Woman on the Beach", "Destiny", "Bogo Bogo", "Jumpo Mambo", "Truth", "Sorrow"
 Turbo: Love is, Cyber Love, X, Remembrance, 
 As One: For You Not To Know
 Brown Eyed Girls: Oasis, Love Action, Hold the Line, La Boheme, You Can't Go, Good Fellas
 Ga-in: Irreversible
 JK Kim Dong Uk: Today, I Will Love You
 PDIS: I Love You (Feat Joo hyun mi), Attractive (Feat. Maydoni)
 S♯arp: Could I
 T: Unforgettable, Tuesday
 UN: Waves
 2012: "Welcome" from Shinhwa's 10th album The Return

References

External links
 

1974 births
Living people
South Korean songwriters
South Korean record producers